is an English Court of Appeal judgment, by which it was decided that negligently caused personal injury cannot be recovered under the trespass to the person, but the tort of negligence must be tried instead.

Facts
Mr Cooper (the defendant) negligently ran over Mrs Letang (the plaintiff) in his Jaguar motor car while she was sunbathing on a piece of grass where cars were parked. The plaintiff filed a claim in trespass to the person, because the claim in negligence was time-barred. Trespass to the person is a tort involving wrongful direct interference with another person and traditionally included both intentional and negligent acts.

Judgment
The Court of Appeal, consisting of Lord Denning MR, Diplock LJ and Danckwerts LJ, held unanimously that since Mr Cooper's actions were negligent rather than intentional, the statute of limitations barring claims actions for damage caused by negligence applied, meaning that Mrs. Letang could not recover as she had filed suit too late.

Effect
The effect of this case was that an action for trespass to the person can now only be brought for intentional torts, such as assault, battery, false imprisonment, trespass to land or chattels, etc. A claimant wishing to recover damages to his person or property that were caused by the defendant's negligent action must prove all the elements of the tort of negligence.  However the decision did not affect actions for trespass to goods.  Conversion is still a strict liability tort under English law, and recover does not depend upon establishing negligence.

Lord Denning summarised the change:

See also
English tort law

External links
 

Lord Denning cases
1964 in British law
Court of Appeal (England and Wales) cases
1964 in case law
English trespass case law